The 2001 Mid-Eastern Athletic Conference men's basketball tournament took place on March 5–10, 2001 at the Arthur Ashe Athletic Center in Richmond, Virginia. Hampton defeated , 70–68 in the championship game, to win its first MEAC Tournament title. The Pirates earned an automatic bid to the 2001 NCAA tournament as #15 seed in the West region. In the round of 64, Hampton upset #2 seed Iowa State 58–57.

Format
All eleven conference members participated, with the top 5 teams receiving a bye to the quarterfinal round. After seeds 6 through 11 completed games in the first round, teams were re-seeded. The lowest remaining seed was slotted against the top seed, next lowest remaining faced the #2 seed, and third lowest remaining seed squared off against the #3 seed.

Bracket

References

MEAC men's basketball tournament
2000–01 Mid-Eastern Athletic Conference men's basketball season
MEAC men's basketball tournament
Basketball competitions in Richmond, Virginia
College basketball tournaments in Virginia